Melchior Thalmann (21 May 1924 – 28 August 2013) was a Swiss gymnast who competed in the 1948 Summer Olympics and in the 1952 Summer Olympics. He won also the worlds championship in 1950 in Rome, Italy and competed in Basel, Switzerland 1954.

References

1924 births
2013 deaths
Swiss male artistic gymnasts
Olympic gymnasts of Switzerland
Gymnasts at the 1948 Summer Olympics
Gymnasts at the 1952 Summer Olympics
Olympic silver medalists for Switzerland
Olympic medalists in gymnastics
Medalists at the 1952 Summer Olympics
Medalists at the 1948 Summer Olympics
20th-century Swiss people